Fred or Frederick Woods may refer to:

 Frederick S. Woods (1864–1950), American mathematician
 Fred Woods (trade unionist) (died 1961), British trade union leader
 Fred Woods (historian) (born 1956), professor at Brigham Young University 
 Frederick Newhall Woods IV (born c. 1952), kidnapper behind the 1976 Chowchilla kidnapping

See also
 Fred Woods Trail, a hiking trail in Pennsylvania